Baxtiyor Sayfullayevich Sayfullayev (3 April 1951 – 14 February 2023) was an Uzbek politician. An independent, he served as Minister of Culture from 2012 to 2020 and was a Senator from 2020 until his death in 2023.

Sayfullayev died on 14 February 2023, at the age of 71.

References

1951 births
2023 deaths
Government ministers of Uzbekistan
Members of the Senate of Uzbekistan
21st-century Uzbekistani politicians
Politicians from Tashkent